Courts of West Virginia include:
;State courts of West Virginia
Supreme Court of Appeals of West Virginia
Intermediate Court of Appeals of West Virginia (Effective July 1, 2022)
West Virginia Circuit Courts (31 judicial circuits)
West Virginia Family Courts
West Virginia Magistrate Courts
West Virginia Municipal Courts

Federal courts located in West Virginia
United States District Court for the Northern District of West Virginia
United States District Court for the Southern District of West Virginia

Former federal courts of West Virginia
 United States District Court for the District of West Virginia (extinct, subdivided)

References

External links
 National Center for State Courts – directory of state court websites.

Courts in the United States
West Virginia state courts